Harald Haas may refer to:
Harald Haas (engineer), professor at the University of Strathclyde
Harald Haas (Pirate Party) (born 1990), former leader of Austrian Pirate Party